Ingwe Local Municipality was an administrative area in the Harry Gwala District of KwaZulu-Natal in South Africa. Ingwe is an isiZulu name word that means leopard. The municipality was given the name because there were leopards in this area many years ago.

The area of the former Ingwe municipality is exceptionally poor and underdeveloped, relying heavily on agriculture as the main source of livelihood. The lack of a major trading centre such as the neighbouring towns of Underberg and Ixopo has limited the economic growth opportunities for this municipality.

After the municipal elections on 3 August 2016 it was merged with Kwa Sani Local Municipality into the new Dr Nkosazana Dlamini Zuma Local Municipality.

Main places
The 2001 census divided the municipality into the following main places:

Politics 
The municipal council consisted of twenty-two members elected by mixed-member proportional representation. Eleven councillors were elected by first-past-the-post voting in eleven wards, while the remaining eleven were chosen from party lists so that the total number of party representatives was proportional to the number of votes received. In the election of 18 May 2011 the African National Congress (ANC) won a majority of sixteen seats on the council.
The following table shows the results of the election.

References

External links
 http://www.ingwe.gov.za/

Former local municipalities of South Africa